Brita Nordlander (1921–2009) was a Swedish teacher and politician, serving as President of the Municipal council of Uppsala, representing the Swedish People's Party, the predecessor of the Liberals.

Besides Brita Nordlander's profession as a teacher, she was a recurring contributor to various newspapers and magazines, including perspectives on literature.

Along with her husband Dr. Nils Brage Nordlander, she was also active in the establishment of the Museum of Medical History in Uppsala.

Distinctions
 Brita Nordlander meeting premise inside the City Hall of Uppsala

References 

1921 births
Swedish schoolteachers
2009 deaths
20th-century Swedish politicians
Liberals (Sweden) politicians
Local politicians in Sweden
20th-century Swedish women politicians